GD 356 is a white dwarf in the constellation of Draco showing an unusual emission of circular polarised light. The star is 65 light years from earth. The class of this white dwarf is DAe meaning that it has a cool helium rich atmosphere. This star exhibits emission lines showing the Zeeman effect in the hydrogen Balmer spectrum.  GD 356 belongs to a class of high field magnetic white dwarfs (HFMWD), but it is unique in that the split lines are purely emission lines with no absorption.  The emission region appears to be due to a heated upper layer in the photosphere in which the magnetic field is uniform to within 10%. The emission can be produced by an atmosphere at 7500K in a gravity field of 106 ms−2 and a magnetic field of 13 megaGauss. The magnetically split emission lines, Hα and Hβ, are circularly polarised. One explanation is that it is caused by a large electric current flowing between the poles of the star and a highly conducting planet.  Other explanations such as being due to Bondi-Hoyle accretion or due to a corona are ruled out by the lack of radio and X-ray emissions.  Accretion of gas at a low rate over a broad area of the star, only results in heating at levels high in the atmosphere and not down to the opacity depth of 1.0 as observed with these lines.

The spectrum does not vary over periods of hours or days.  This indicates that the rotation axis must match the magnetic dipole axis. The power radiated by the emission lines is 1027 erg s−1. Overall light from the white dwarf varies by 0.2% smoothly over a period of 117 minutes.  Explanations given for the variation are a dark spot rotating with the star.  This could be near the rotation pole when viewed nearly edge on, or could be on the equator with the pole pointing roughly towards Earth.

Other catalog names for this are LP 137-43, EGGR 329 and WD 1639+537.

Properties
In order to reach a temperature of 7510 K it would have become a white dwarf about 1.6 Gya. Prior to this the main sequence lifetime would have been 500 million years giving it a total age of 2.1 billion years. The current magnitude is 15.

The absolute visual magnitude is +13.43±0.16. Proper motion is 0.24" pa, in direction 212°.
The trigonometric parallax is 21.1 parsecs. Tangential motion is 25 km−1.

Spectrum
The Hα line splitting is 44.5 nm.  In similar white dwarfs an absorption line is expected to be seen instead, so that means the emission has sufficient energy to overpower any absorption. The emission was originally discovered by Jesse L. Greenstein.  The original Hα line has a wavelength at 655.2 nm and is called the π component.  The blue shifted component σ− has wavelength 633.4 nm and red shifted component line σ+ is at 678.2 nm.

Possible companion
The unipolar-inductor theory says that a high-conduction companion orbits. As it moves through the star's magnetic field, a high voltage is produced between the star facing side of the planet and the dark side.  A current then flows along field lines to the point on the star where the field lines meet the star's photosphere, the current is completed through the photosphere heating it up.

A planet in a close orbit would develop the shape of the Roche potential and is very likely to be molten due to tidal heating.  A planet with a density of over five g/cm3 is stable at an orbital period longer than 4.7 hours.  A planet in this kind of orbit may have a temperature of 560 K and could be detectable in infrared if it was large enough.

Infrared observations rule out a large companion such as a brown dwarf or other large planet over twelve Jupiter masses.  This is based on the expected temperature of 2.1 billion year old planets.

A planet could possibly get into this situation by evaporating while orbiting inside the gaseous shell of the red giant and at the same time having its orbit decay due to bow-shock friction with the gas.  Tides induce on the expanded star by the planet would also cause the orbit to decay, rather than expand as might have been expected to loss of gas from the star. These possibilities have been studied because that is the expected future of the Earth. Another hypothesis is that close-in planets could have formed during the merger of two white dwarfs.

References

Draco (constellation)
White dwarfs
Emission-line stars
Gliese and GJ objects